Lago dell'Antenna is an artificial lake in north-west Italy, located in the Genoa (Liguria). Concerned comunes are Urbe and Sassello.

Geography 
The lake was created by blocking the Orba with a dam about two kilometres upstream of San Pietro d'Urbe, in oder to produce electricity.
Its name comes from Monte Antenna (821 m), a mountain which overlooks the left banks of the lake. The right banks of the reservoir are flanked by the provincial road nr. 40 Urbe - Vara - Passo del Faiallo and from Bric del Sozzo (650 m). The lake is located on the northern border of Parco naturale regionale del Beigua, which encompasses its left shore.

History 
Antenna lake was realised in 1922 in order to provide water to the hydroelectric power plant of the Cotonificio Ligure, located in San Pietro d'Orba. During the 1940s the reservoir capacity was considered insufficient and started dam extension works which ended in 1946, bringing the reservoir capacity up to around 50.000 m³. Present-day dam is a masonry arch-gravity dam; it finally inspection took place in February 1952. Nowadays the reservoir capacity is restricted by the sedimentation on the lake bed and is estimated to be around 30,000 m³.

Fishing 

Lake Antenna is classified, following Province of Savona fishing map, as a B category water body (Acque di categoria B), thus mixed population water. The lake is also defined as touristic fishing reserve (riserva di pesca turistica), and is restocked with rainbow trouts when authorised by Parco del Beigua. Restocking with brown trouts is not permitted because they are not considered native fish. The lake is the subject of a yearly fauna survey. Access rules are defined by Provincia di Savona administration.

References 

Reservoirs in Italy
Lakes of Liguria
Lago dell'Antenna